Lorne Mayencourt (born 1957) is a Canadian politician, who formerly represented the electoral district of Vancouver-Burrard in the Legislative Assembly of British Columbia as a member of the BC Liberal party.

Career

Mayencourt was first elected in the 2001 provincial election, defeating New Democrat opponent Tim Stevenson.
He was previously the founder and, for its first five years, executive director of the Vancouver Friends for Life Society, which supports people living with AIDS, cancer and other life-threatening illnesses.

He is the founder of the BC New Hope Recovery Society and Baldy Hughes Therapeutic Community in North Central BC which supports addicts in a long-term recovery community.

In the 2005 election, conflicting results throughout the night had both Mayencourt and Stevenson declared the victor in Vancouver-Burrard, and the uncertainty continued for several weeks. In the final count of regular ballots, Stevenson was declared the winner by 17 votes; however, when absentee ballots were counted on May 30, Mayencourt was declared the winner by a margin of 18 votes. After a judicial recount, Mayencourt was declared the victor by 11 votes.

He is known for his Private Member's Bill called the Safe Streets Act (2004), which aimed to deter aggressive panhandling.  He chaired the provincial Safe Schools Task Force (2003) and introduced the Safe Schools Act (2005) to combat bullying in the school system based on racism, sexism and homophobia.  He introduced the Apology Act to facilitate sincere and timely reconciliation between government, business and citizens.

Mayencourt announced that he would not run in the 2009 provincial election, and resigned early to run as the Conservative Party of Canada's candidate in Vancouver Centre for the 2008 general election. He lost to incumbent Liberal MP Hedy Fry.

Mayencourt announced that he would seek the BC Liberal Party nomination in the riding of Vancouver-False Creek for the 2013 British Columbia general election after the current incumbent Mary McNeil announced she would not be seeking another term.  His main competition was former Vancouver Mayor Sam Sullivan, who ended up winning the nomination and subsequently winning the election.

Electoral record

References 
 

1957 births
British Columbia candidates for Member of Parliament
British Columbia Liberal Party MLAs
Canadian LGBT people in provincial and territorial legislatures
Conservative Party of Canada candidates for the Canadian House of Commons
Gay politicians
Living people
Politicians from Vancouver
Canadian gay men